Lawrence Muzzy Lansburgh (May 18, 1911 in San Francisco, California – March 25, 2001 in Eagle Point, Oregon) was an American producer, director, and screenwriter known for his films featuring animals.

Career

Lansburgh's film career began in the early 1930s, when he performed stunts for Cecil B. DeMille–directed films. After he broke his leg falling off a horse, he took a clerical job at Walt Disney Studios. In this position, he hired Bob Broughton.

He subsequently began participating in production as a cameraman, accompanying Walt Disney on Disney's 1941 tour of South America, and contributing to the productions of Three Caballeros, Saludos Amigos, and So Dear to My Heart. In 1969, he wrote and directed the Disney film Hang Your Hat on the Wind.

Recognition

Lansburgh's 1957 Wetback Hound won the 1958 Academy Award for Best Short Subject (Live Action), and his 1960 The Horse with the Flying Tail won the 1961 Academy Award for Best Documentary.

In 1998, he received a Disney Legends award.

Lansburgh's film Dawn Flight was preserved by the Academy Film Archive in 2013.

Personal life

Lansburgh was the son of architect G. Albert Lansburgh. 

His first wife, Janet Martin, was originally Disney's publicist.

He was a fervent equestrian, and served as a judge at the American Royal Horse Show, where he met his second wife Olive.

He died on his ranch in Eagle Point, Oregon.

References

External links

1911 births
2001 deaths
Film directors from San Francisco
People from Eagle Point, Oregon
Directors of Live Action Short Film Academy Award winners
Producers who won the Live Action Short Film Academy Award
Directors of Best Documentary Feature Academy Award winners
Producers of Best Documentary Feature Academy Award winners
Walt Disney Animation Studios people
Disney Legends